Christianne Geiger Gobrecht (born February 9, 1955) is an American basketball coach who is currently the head coach of the United States Air Force Academy women's basketball team. A coach since 1977, she has been a head coach at the high school, junior college, and NCAA levels, and is known for only hiring female assistant coaches in order to protect opportunities for women.

Coaching career 
Gobrecht began her coaching career at Santa Fe Springs High School for one season before named the head coach at Pasadena City College, where she won a conference championship in her lone season there. She was also the head coach at Cal State Fullerton for six seasons prior to accepting the head coaching position at Washington, where she won two Pac-10 Conference titles and was named Pac-10 coach of the year twice. She was also the head coach at Florida State for one season prior to joining her alma mater USC in 1997. She led the Trojans to two WNIT appearances before she was fired at the end of the 2003–04 season. Gobrecht took the 2004–05 season off to spend time with family, accepting the head coaching position at Yale in 2005.

Gobrecht was named the head coach at Air Force on April 14, 2015. She signed a contract extension after the 2017–18 season that extended her contract through the 2022–23 season.

In 2022, the Mountain West Conference named Gobrecht the Coach of the Year in women's basketball after Air Force finished the regular season 17–12 (11–7 MW), the program's first winning season since it moved from Division II to Division I in 1996. After advancing to the second round of the 2022 Women's National Invitation Tournament, Air Force finished the 2021–22 season 19–12 overall.

Head coaching record

Personal life 
Gobrecht was married to Bob Gobrecht, who died in 2018 from an undisclosed illness. The couple had two children; Eric and Mady. Eric attended the Air Force Academy and is a Major stationed at Beale Air Force Base in California, while Mady played for her mother at Yale and is currently a nurse in Colorado Springs.

References

External links 
 
 Air Force Falcons profile

1955 births
Living people
Sportspeople from Toledo, Ohio
Basketball players from Ohio
Basketball coaches from Ohio
USC Trojans women's basketball players
High school basketball coaches in California
Cal State Fullerton Titans women's basketball coaches
Washington Huskies women's basketball coaches
Florida State Seminoles women's basketball coaches
USC Trojans women's basketball coaches
Yale Bulldogs women's basketball coaches
Air Force Falcons women's basketball coaches